Survivants means survivors in French. Survivants, Survivantes, Survivante, Survivant, or, variant, may refer to:

Literature
 SurVivantes: Rwanda, Dix Ans Après Le Génocide (book), a 2004 award-winning non-fiction book by Esther Mujawayo
 "Les Survivants", a 2001 volume of the multi-volume graphic novel Bételgeuse, in the Worlds of Aldebaran comic book series
 Survivants, a 2010s multi-volume graphic novel, in the Worlds of Aldebaran comic book series
 La Survivante, a 1980s multi-volume graphic novel by Paul Gillon
 "La Survivante", a 1985 volume of the multi-volume graphic novel La Survivante by Paul Gillon

Film and television
 Les Survivants, a 1965 TV series scored by François de Roubaix 
 Survivant(s), a 2010 short film starring Alysson Paradis
 Les Survivants, a 2016 film starring Erika Sainte
 White Paradise (2022 film), a French film starring Denis Ménochet, Zar Amir Ebrahimi and Victoire Du Bois

Other uses
 Survivant, a 2004 album by Starflam
 "Les Survivants", the nickname of the France men's national volleyball team

See also

 
 
 
 
 
 Survivor (disambiguation)
 Survival (disambiguation)
 Survive (disambiguation)
 Surviving
 Vivant (disambiguation)
 Sur (disambiguation)